Ramularia is a genus of ascomycete fungi. Its species, which are anamorphs of the genus Mycosphaerella, are plant pathogens. Hosts include Narcissus and barley.

References

Further reading

External links
 

 
Fungal plant pathogens and diseases
Mycosphaerellaceae genera